Ernesto "Estoy" Estrada (November 7, 1949 – May 17, 2015) was a Filipino basketball player. A feared outside shooter, Estrada played for San Miguel Corporation in the amateurs and spent eight seasons in the Philippine Basketball Association from 1975 to 1982 with Royal Tru-Orange, Toyota, where he was part of two championships in 1978, Great Taste and Mariwasa-Honda. Estrada averaged 19.6 points per game in a total of 289 games played and made it once to the PBA Mythical team.

References

1949 births
2015 deaths
Filipino men's basketball players
Basketball players from Cebu
Sportspeople from Cebu City
San Miguel Beermen players
Toyota Super Corollas players
Great Taste Coffee Makers players
Cebuano people
UV Green Lancers basketball players
Small forwards
Filipino emigrants to the United States